= List of animated feature films of the 2030s =

1. REDIRECT Draft:List of animated feature films of 2030
